Elizabeth is a village in Jo Daviess County, Illinois, United States. The population was 761 at the 2010 census.

Geography

Elizabeth is located at  (42.317007, -90.223231).

Climate

Demographics

As of the 2000 United States Census, there were 682 people, 309 households, and 177 families residing in the village. The racial makeup of the village was 98.97% White, 0.15% African American, 0.15% Asian, and 0.73% from two or more races. Hispanic or Latino of any race were 0.15% of the population.

There were 309 households, out of which 21.0% had children under the age of 18 living with them, 46.9% were married couples living together, 7.1% had a female householder with no spouse present, and 42.4% were non-families. 39.8% of all households were made up of individuals, and 23.6% had someone living alone who was 65 years of age or older.  The average household size was 2.05 and the average family size was 2.74.

In the village, the population was spread out, with 17.4% under the age of 18, 5.9% from 18 to 24, 21.8% from 25 to 44, 22.6% from 45 to 64, and 32.3% who were 65 years of age or older.  The median age was 48 years. For every 100 females, there were 84.8 males.  For every 100 females age 18 and over, there were 79.9 males.

The median income for a household in the village was $33,587, and the median income for a family was $41,354. Males had a median income of $27,917 versus $23,636 for females. The per capita income for the village was $17,235.  About 4.5% of families and 8.2% of the population were below the poverty line, including 8.5% of those under age 18 and 13.7% of those age 65 or over.

Former U.S. Congressman John C. McKenzie lived most of his life in Elizabeth and is buried at Elizabeth Cemetery.

Leo E. Allen, 14-term U.S. Congressman, was born in Elizabeth.

Notable multi-instrumentalist Andrew Bird has a home on a farm just outside this village.

Wisconsin musical act PHOX is currently writing / recording their second album in Elizabeth. No concrete details, including a release date, have been released.

Printed media
Although a settlement of modest size, Elizabeth incorporated in 1868, has a long history of printed media. It was first served by the Elizabeth News, starting at the latest in 1889. In 1913 or 1914 the paper changed its name to the Elizabeth Weekly News. The Elizabeth Weekly continued its publication until 1979. A second newspaper, the Elizabeth Times, was published in the village from 1937 through 1955.

Education
River Ridge Community Unit School District 210 operates area public schools, including River Ridge High School.

See also
Apple River Fort
Battle of Apple River Fort
Chicago Great Western Railroad Depot
Elizabeth Armstrong

References

External links
Elizabeth Chamber of Commerce
Village Municipal Web Page

Villages in Jo Daviess County, Illinois
Villages in Illinois